"Precious Time" is a popular song written by Northern Irish singer-songwriter Van Morrison and recorded on his 1999 album, Back on Top.  It was released as a single in the UK and charted at No. 36. Since first recording it, Morrison has played it in concert 574 times from March 1998 until June 2008, making it one of his most frequently performed songs.

Recording and composition
It was recorded in 1998 at The Wool Hall Studios in Beckington with Walter Samuel as engineer.

"Precious Time"  has a happy upbeat melody and introspective lyrics about the quick passing of time: 
Precious time is slipping away
You know you're only king for a day
It doesn't matter to which God you pray
Precious time is slipping away

Other releases
A live performance version from Morrison's appearance at the Austin City Limits Festival on 15 September 2006, was included on the limited edition album, Live at Austin City Limits Festival. In 2007, this song was included on the compilation album, The Best of Van Morrison Volume 3 and a remastered version of this song is included on another 2007 compilation album, Still on Top - The Greatest Hits.

Personnel
Van Morrison – vocals
Geraint Watkins – Hammond organ
Mick Green – electric and acoustic guitars
Ian Jennings – double bass
Bobby Irwin – drums
Pee Wee Ellis – tenor and baritone saxophones
Brian Kennedy – backing vocals

Notes

References
Heylin, Clinton (2003). Can You Feel the Silence? Van Morrison: A New Biography, Chicago Review Press, 

1999 singles
Van Morrison songs
Songs written by Van Morrison
1998 songs
Polydor Records singles
Song recordings produced by Van Morrison